"Hermann und Thusnelda" is a poem written in 1752 by Friedrich Gottlieb Klopstock exalting the Cheruscan chieftain Arminius, whom Johannes Turmair and Martin Luther named Hermann in the 16th century, and his wife Thusnelda. The poem was set to music by Franz Schubert in 1815 ( 322).

History 
Since the rediscovery of Tacitus's Germania in the 16th century, Germans have exalted the Germanic tribes as their direct ancestors. They especially praised German liberty defended by Arminius in 9 A.D. when three legions of the Roman Empire were defeated on Germanic soil, thus putting an end to Roman plans to subjugate Germania.

In Klopstock's poem, blood-stained Hermann returns from battle and is praised by his wife Thusnelda, who is happy about the death of the Roman soldiers. Her husband's victory heavily delights her making her confess that her love for Hermann has never been as ardent as now after the lurid fight. Arminius himself only regrets that Roman emperor Augustus has not been present as he would have slain him.

Klopstock wrote several other dramas and poems about "Germany's liberator":

 Hermanns Schlacht. Ein Bardiet für die Schaubühne (1769);
 Hermann und die Fürsten. Ein Bardiet für die Schaubühne (1784);
 Hermanns Tod. Ein Bardiet für die Schaubühne (1787);
 "Wir und sie" (1798);
 "Hermann aus Walhalla" (1798).

In his later years, Christoph Willibald Gluck got interested in patriotic Germanic sujets and notably in Klopstock's œuvres. Hence, he had planned to set the monumental work Hermanns Schlacht to music, but he died before he could realize it.

Lyrics

See also 
 Arminius, 1877 oratorio by Max Bruch
 Die Hermannsschlacht, 1808 play by Heinrich von Kleist

References

External links 
 ; Janet Baker, Dietrich Fischer-Dieskau, Gerald Moore

German patriotic songs
Lieder composed by Franz Schubert
German poems
1752 poems
Cultural depictions of Arminius
Love stories